Iuniarra Sipaia (née Simanu, born 25 June 1993) is a Samoan female weightlifter. She has represented Samoa in several international competitions such as Pacific Mini Games, Commonwealth Games, Oceania Weightlifting Championships and Asian Indoor and Martial Arts Games.

As a junior, she participated at the 2010 Summer Youth Olympics in the Girls' +63 event. She participated at the 2010 Commonwealth Games in the +75 kg event. She won the bronze medal at the 2011 Pacific Games.

Iuniarra won gold medal at the 2013 Pacific Mini Games in the over 75 kg category and set a new milestone in the sport of Weightlifting in Samoa. She was able to represent Samoa at the 2014 Commonwealth Games and competed in the women's over 75 kg category. She continued her dominance in the sport as she claimed 3 gold medals in the over 75 kg categories at the 2016 Oceania Weightlifting Championships. She was also the part of the Samoan delegation which made its debut at the 2017 Asian Indoor and Martial Arts Games and claimed a bronze medal in the women's +90 kg event.

At the 2017 Australian Open Weightlifting Championships, she emerged as runners-up to a New Zealand transgender weightlifter, Laurel Hubbard. Laurel Hubbard lifted a weight of 268kg, which was 19kg more than that of Iuniarra Sipaia of Samoa and raised controversial issues relating to the approval of Laurel Hubbard to compete at the international competition.

After the 2017 Asian Indoor and Martial Arts Games she was subsequently suspended for using Triamcinolone acetonide. In April 2018 she cleared herself out and her ban was abolished. However, she had to missed the 2017 Pacific Mini Games, where she was a defending champion and couldn't compete at the 2018 Commonwealth Games.

Major results

References

External links 
 
 
 Profile at 2014 CWG
 Profile at Australian Weightlifting

1993 births
Living people
Samoan female weightlifters
Weightlifters at the 2014 Commonwealth Games
Commonwealth Games competitors for Samoa
Weightlifters at the 2010 Summer Youth Olympics
20th-century Samoan people
21st-century Samoan people